The 2000 European Taekwondo Championships were held in Patras, Greece. The event took place from 4 to 7 May, 2000.

Medal summary

Men

Women

References

External links 
 European Taekwondo Union

European Taekwondo Championships
International sports competitions hosted by Greece
2000 in taekwondo
2000 in European sport
2000 in Greek sport
Sports competitions in Patras